Ryan Wynott (born December 6, 1999 in California) is an American actor. He is best known for playing Dylan Simcoe on the television series FlashForward (2009–2010) and as Trip Faraday on The Cape (2011).

Filmography

References

Personal life 
Ryan is an expert Avalon player.

External links

1999 births
21st-century American male actors
Male actors from California
American male child actors
American male film actors
American male television actors
Living people